Gaming in China could refer to:

Video gaming in China
Online gaming in China
Sports in China
National Games of China